The 2007 WAFF U-15 Championship was the second edition of the WAFF U-15 Championship, the annual international youth football championship organised by the WAFF for the men's under-15 national teams of West Asia. It took place in Aleppo, Syria. Five teams entered the competition.

Iran were the defending champions. Players born on or after 1 January 1992 were eligible to compete.

Tournament

References 

WAFF Championship tournaments
WAFF
International association football competitions hosted by Syria